Melvyn Keefer (July 2, 1926 – February 11, 2022) was an American comics artist and illustrator. Best known for the comic strip Mac Divot, he was a lifetime Inkpot Award inductee.

Life and career 
Born in Los Angeles, California, Keefer trained as an illustrator at the Santa Monica School of Art run by Jefferson Machamer and the ArtCenter College of Design. He made his debut as a comics artist drawing Perry Mason for King Features Syndicate. He is best known for the long-running golf-themed series Mac Divot, which he created together with Jordan Lanski for the Chicago Tribune Syndicate and which ran for twenty years starting from 1955. Other comic strips Keefer has worked in include Thorne McBride (1960–1963), Rick O'Shay (which he drew between 1978 and 1981) and the comic versions of Dragnet and Gene Autry.

Besides his activity as a cartoonist, Keefer also worked as an illustrator for books, magazines and other publications. He authored the artwork of the Richard Quine's film How to Murder Your Wife. In 2007, Keefer was awarded a lifetime Inkpot Award for his career.

Keefer died on February 11, 2022, at the age of 95.

References

External links
Mel Keefer at Lambiek
Mel Keefer at Inducks

1926 births
2022 deaths
American comics artists
American illustrators
Artists from Los Angeles
Art Center College of Design alumni
20th-century American male artists